The 1893–94 Scottish Division One season was the first season in which the Scottish Football League had been split between two divisions. The league championship was won by Celtic, three points ahead of nearest rival Heart of Midlothian.

League table

Results

References 

 Scottish Football Archive

1893–94 Scottish Football League
Scottish Division One seasons